
Gmina Czernikowo is a rural gmina (administrative district) in Toruń County, Kuyavian-Pomeranian Voivodeship, in north-central Poland.

Villages
Gmina Czernikowo contains the villages and settlements of Czernikówko, Czernikowo, Jackowo, Kiełpiny, Kijaszkowo, Liciszewy, Makowiska, Mazowsze, Mazowsze-Parcele, Osówka, Pokrzywno, Skwirynowo, Steklin, Steklinek, Witowąż, Wygoda and Zimny Zdrój.

Neighbouring gminas
Gmina Czernikowo is bordered by the towns of Ciechocinek and Nieszawa, and by the gminas of Bobrowniki, Ciechocin, Kikół, Lipno, Obrowo, Raciążek and Zbójno.

References
Polish official population figures 2006

Czernikowo
Toruń County